Armel N'Dinga Koulara Kwanyéllé (born 15 August 1989 in N'Djamena, Chad; known simply as Armel Koulara and occasionally Armel Kwanyéllé) is a former footballer from Chad who played as a goalkeeper .

Attributes 

An agile and sprightly goalkeeper in addition to being a penalty specialist, Armel was Gazelle's first choice penalty taker, following in the footsteps of other goal-scoring 'keepers such as Brazilian Rogério Ceni, Vincent Enyeama of Hapoel Tel Aviv and Nigeria, Hans-Jörg Butt of FC Bayern Munich and José Luis Chilavert, formerly of Paraguay. Armel has scored 11 goals for Gazelle, all of them penalty kicks; however his penalty taking privileges did not extend to the Chad national football team, for whom he has 14 caps, with Misdongard Betoligar occupying the role for the Sao.

See also
 List of Chad international footballers

References

External links
 

1989 births
Living people
Chadian footballers
Chad international footballers
People from N'Djamena
Association football goalkeepers